Frederik Willems (born 8 September 1979) is a Belgian former professional road bicycle racer who competed professionally from 2003 tp 2014.

Career achievements

Major results

2000
 1st Stage 1 GP Tell
 2nd Ronde van Vlaanderen U23
2001
 1st Seraing-Aachen-Seraing
 4th Vlaamse Pijl
 6th Overall Le Triptyque des Monts et Châteaux
1st Stage 4
 6th Grand Prix de Waregem
2002
 1st Stage 7 Vuelta a Cuba
2004
 1st  Mountains classification, Three Days of De Panne
 10th Overall Tour de l'Avenir
 10th Overall Circuit des Mines
2005
 10th Overall Tour de Wallonie
2006
 1st  Overall Étoile de Bessèges
1st Stage 1
 1st Stage 4 Tour of Britain
 4th Overall Driedaagse van West-Vlaanderen
 5th Overall Ster Elektrotoer
1st Stage 3
 7th Nokere Koerse
2008
 5th Brabantse Pijl
2009
 1st  Overall Three Days of De Panne
 6th Brabantse Pijl

Grand Tour general classification results timeline

References

External links

 
 Palmares at Cycling Base
 

1979 births
Living people
Belgian male cyclists
People from Eeklo
Cyclists from East Flanders